Cement chemist notation (CCN) was developed to simplify the formulas cement chemists use on a daily basis. It is a shorthand way of writing the chemical formula of oxides of calcium, silicon, and various metals.

Abbreviations of oxides

The main oxides present in cement (or in glass and ceramics) are abbreviated in the following way:

Conversion of hydroxides in oxide and free water
For the sake of mass balance calculations, hydroxides present in hydrated phases found in hardened cement paste, such as in portlandite, Ca(OH)2, must first be converted into oxide and water.

To better understand the conversion process of hydroxide anions in oxide and water, it is necessary to consider the autoprotolysis of the hydroxyl anions; it implies a proton exchange between two OH−, like in a classical acid–base reaction:

 +  →  + 
or also,
2 OH− → O2− + H2O

For portlandite this gives thus the following mass balance:

Ca(OH)2 → CaO + H2O

Thus portlandite can be written as CaO · H2O or CH.

Main phases in Portland cement before and after hydration

These oxides are used to build more complex compounds. The main crystalline phases described hereafter are related respectively to the composition of: 
 Clinker and non-hydrated Portland cement, and; 
 Hardened cement pastes obtained after hydration and cement setting.

Clinker and non-hydrated Portland cement

Four main phases are present in the clinker and in the non-hydrated Portland cement. They are formed at high temperature (1,450 °C) in the cement kiln and are the following:

The four compounds referred as C3S, C2S, C3A and C4AF are known as the main crystalline phases of Portland cement. The phase composition of a particular cement can be quantified through a complex set of calculation known as the Bogue formula.

Hydrated cement paste

Hydration products formed in hardened cement pastes (also known as HCPs) are more complicated, because many of these products have nearly the same formula and some are solid solutions with overlapping formulas. Some examples are given below:

The hyphens in C-S-H indicate a calcium silicate hydrate phase of variable composition, while 'CSH' would indicate a calcium silicate phase, CaH2SiO4.

Use in ceramics, glass, and oxide chemistry
The cement chemist notation is not restricted to cement applications but is in fact a more general notation of oxide chemistry applicable to other domains than cement chemistry sensu stricto.

For instance, in ceramics applications, the kaolinite formula can also be written in terms of oxides, thus the corresponding formula for kaolinite, 
Al2Si2O5(OH)4,

is
Al2O3 · 2 SiO2 · 2 H2O

or in CCN
AS2H2.

Possible use of CCN in mineralogy
Although not a very developed practice in mineralogy, some chemical reactions involving silicate and oxide in the melt or in hydrothermal systems, and silicate weathering processes could also be successfully described by applying the cement chemist notation to silicate mineralogy.

An example could be the formal comparison of belite hydration and forsterite serpentinisation dealing both with the hydration of two structurally similar earth -alkaline silicates, Ca2SiO4 and Mg2SiO4, respectively.

Calcium system belite hydration:

Magnesium system forsterite serpentinisation:

The ratio Ca/Si (C/S) and Mg/Si (M/S) decrease from 2 for the dicalcium and dimagnesium silicate reagents to 1.5 for the hydrated silicate products of the hydration reaction. In other term, the C-S-H or the serpentine are less rich in Ca and Mg respectively. This is why the reaction leads to the elimination of the excess of portlandite (Ca(OH)2) and brucite (Mg(OH)2), respectively,  out of the silicate system, giving rise to the crystallization of both hydroxides as separate phases.

The rapid reaction of belite hydration in the setting of cement is formally "chemically analogue" to the slow natural hydration of forsterite (the magnesium end-member of olivine) leading to the formation of serpentine and brucite in nature. However, the kinetic of hydration of poorly crystallized artificial belite is much swifter than the slow conversion/weathering of well crystallized Mg-olivine under natural conditions.

This comparison suggests that mineralogists could probably also benefit from the concise formalism of the cement chemist notation in their works.

See also
 Hydration of belite in cement (analogous to forsterite hydration)
 Hydration reaction of forsterite (olivine) in serpentinisation

References

External links
 Cement and Concrete Glossary

Cement
Concrete
Chemical formulas
Oxide minerals
Silicates